Kalateh-ye Zaman (also Romanized as Kalāteh-ye Zamān) is a village in Qushkhaneh-ye Bala Rural District, Qushkhaneh District, Shirvan County, North Khorasan Province, Iran. At the 2006 census, its population was 210, in 43 families.

References 

Populated places in Shirvan County